Oak Bay is the northernmost section of Passamaquoddy Bay, into which the St. Croix River empties. The rural community of Oak Bay lies on the shores of this embayment.

History

Located in the centre of the bay is Spoon Island, named so as it resembles an overturned spoon.

References

Bays of New Brunswick
Landforms of Charlotte County, New Brunswick